
Gmina Drwinia is a rural gmina (administrative district) in Bochnia County, Lesser Poland Voivodeship, in southern Poland.

Villages
Gmina Drwinia contains the villages and settlements of Bieńkowice, Drwinia, Dziewin, Gawłówek, Ispina, Mikluszowice, Niedary, Świniary, Trawniki, Wola Drwińska, Wyżyce and Zielona.

Neighbouring gminas
Gmina Drwinia is bordered by the gminas of Bochnia, Igołomia-Wawrzeńczyce, Kłaj, Koszyce, Niepołomice, Nowe Brzesko and Szczurowa.

References
 Polish official population figures 2006

Drwinia
Bochnia County